Ogishkemuncie Lake is a lake in Lake County, in the U.S. state of Minnesota.

The name Ogishkemuncie is derived from the Ojibwe word ogiishkimanisii, meaning "kingfisher".

See also
List of lakes in Minnesota

References

Lakes of Minnesota
Lakes of Lake County, Minnesota